Bishunpur may refer to:

 Bishunpur, Nepal, a town
 Bishunpur block, an administrative unit of Jharkhand, India
 Bishunpur (Vidhan Sabha constituency)
 Bishunpur, Jaunpur, a village in Uttar Pradesh, India
 Bishunpur block, a community development block in Jharkhand, India
 Bishunpur, Gumla, a village in Jharkhand, India
 Bishunpur Vishram, village in Uttar Pradesh, India

See also 
 
 Bishnupur (disambiguation)